I Love Music may refer to:

In music:
 "I Love Music" (The O'Jays song), a 1975 disco song written by Gamble and Huff and recorded by The O'Jays, covered in 1993 by Rozalla
 "I Love Music" (jazz composition), a 1974 jazz composition by Hale Smith with lyrics by Emil Boyd

In other areas:
 I Love Music (forum), an internet popular music forum founded in 2000